FSGP 2012 was held at the Monticello Motor Club in Monticello, New York, and served as a qualifier for the 2012 American Solar Challenge. It was won by the University of Michigan.

Auto races in the United States